General Wolf, Wolff, or Wolfe may refer to:

Adolf Wolf (1899–1973), German Luftwaffe major general
Edward Wolfe (1685–1759), British Army lieutenant general
Herbert E. Wolff (1925–2009), U.S. Army major general
James Wolfe (1727–1759), British Army major general
Karl Wolff (1900–1984), German SS general
Ludwig Wolff (general) (1893–1968), German Wehrmacht general
Ludwig Wolff (general, born 1886) (1886–1950), German Luftwaffe general

See also
Little Wolf (c. 1820—1904), Northern Só'taeo'o Chief 
Hermann Wulf (1915–1990), German Bundeswehr brigadier general
Rudolf Wulf (1905–1972), German Wehrmacht major general